Rabbi Yisrael Ariel (born Yisrael Stieglitz in 1939) was the chief rabbi of the evacuated Israeli settlement of Yamit in the Sinai Peninsula during the years when the Sinai was controlled by Israel, and the founder of the Temple Institute (Machon HaMikdash). His brother, Rabbi Yaakov Ariel, served as the rosh yeshiva in the yeshiva in Yamit and later was the chief rabbi of Ramat Gan.

Biography

Ariel is a graduate of the Mercaz HaRav Yeshiva. As a young man, Ariel served in the Paratroopers Brigade unit that captured the Temple Mount in the Six-Day War.

For the 1981 Knesset elections, Ariel ran as number two on the Kach list, with Rabbi Meir Kahane in the number-one spot. His involvement predates the party's split after the death of party leader Rabbi Kahane in 1990 (who was assassinated by Egyptian El Sayyid Nosair), and the party's later designation as a terrorist Jewish group by the United States and Israel in 2001.

As of 2006, aside from being the head of the Temple Institute, he is also involved in an attempt to revive the Sanhedrin.

In December 2006, he was briefly arrested and interrogated by Israeli police after confronting General Elazar Stern, before being released.

Views
He urges that the Pesach sacrificial service on the Temple Mount should be resumed, and that the Temple should be rebuilt as soon as possible.

He called Baruch Goldstein, who murdered 29 Palestinian worshippers in the Cave of the Patriarchs massacre, a "holy martyr".

In 2015, he described Jewish religious terrorism suspects who were banned from entering the West Bank due to vandalism, as praiseworthy.

He also criticized gay people who walked on the Temple Mount, and suggested that some earthquakes were divine retribution from God as a result of gay people walking on the mount.

See also
 Modern attempts to revive the Sanhedrin

References

External links
 Temple Institute - Machon HaMikdash
 Temple Institute - Liberating the Temple Mount '67 

Israeli Kahanists
Living people
1939 births
Religious Zionist Orthodox rabbis
Mercaz HaRav alumni
Israeli people of the Six-Day War
Paratroopers